"I've Been Good to You" is a 1961 R&B song by The Miracles on Motown Records' Tamla label. It was released as the B-side of their Billboard Top 40 hit, "What's So Good About Goodbye", and was included on their album I'll Try Something New the following year. This sad, melancholy ballad charted #103 on the Billboard Pop chart. Despite its relatively modest chart placing, this song has been hugely influential, and is noted as Beatle John Lennon's favorite Miracles tune, and was the inspiration for The Beatles' songs "This Boy" and "Sexy Sadie". Written by Miracles lead singer Smokey Robinson, the song begins with the lyric, "Look what you've done...You've made a fool out of someone..." which Lennon later paraphrased in Sexy Sadie song as, "What have you done...You've made a fool of everyone."

The song was performed live by the group on their album, The Miracles Recorded Live on Stage, and has inspired cover versions by Marshall Crenshaw, Joe Meek, The Temptones, Ray, Goodman & Brown (The Moments), The Ones, and fellow Motown artists, Brenda Holloway, and The Temptations. The Temptations' version would also be released as a "B" side and would chart at #124 on the Pop charts in 1967 (as well be released on their 1966 album Gettin' Ready). In addition to being on their first Live album, The Miracles' original version of "I've Been Good to You" actually appears on two other of their early 1960s albums; 1962's I'll Try Something New, and 1963's The Fabulous Miracles.

During a 2009 appearance by Robinson on the Internet/television show Live from Daryl's House, hosted by Daryl Hall, the duo performed "I've Been Good to You", among other songs. During some playful, improvisational singing at the end, Robinson sang, "I don't know where you came up with this song... I haven't heard it in so long..."

Personnel – The Miracles
Smokey Robinson – Lead vocals
Bobby Rogers – Background vocals
Pete Moore – Background vocals
Claudette Robinson – Background vocals
Ronnie White – Background vocals
Marv Tarplin – Guitar

Personnel – The Temptations
Eddie Kendricks – Lead vocals
David Ruffin – Background vocals
Melvin Franklin – Lead & Background vocals
Paul Williams – Background vocals
Otis Williams – Background vocals

Additional instruments
 By The Funk Brothers

References

External links
 
 I've Been Good to You- by The Miracles – Song review from the "Motown Junkies" website.

1961 singles
1967 singles
1968 singles
The Miracles songs
Songs written by Smokey Robinson
Song recordings produced by Berry Gordy
Tamla Records singles
The Temptations songs
Brenda Holloway songs
Gordy Records singles
Song recordings produced by Smokey Robinson